The 1979 Los Angeles Dodgers finished the season in third place in the Western Division of the National League. Near the end of the season, owner Walter O'Malley died, and the ownership of the team went to his son, Peter.

Offseason 
 February 15, 1979: Brad Gulden was traded by the Dodgers to the New York Yankees for Gary Thomasson.

Regular season

Season standings

Record vs. opponents

Opening Day lineup

Notable transactions 
 April 7, 1979: Rick Rhoden was traded by the Dodgers to the Pittsburgh Pirates for Jerry Reuss.
 May 11, 1979: Lance Rautzhan was purchased from the Dodgers by the Milwaukee Brewers.
 May 11, 1979: Lerrin LaGrow was purchased by the Dodgers from the Chicago White Sox.

Roster

Player stats

Batting

Starters by position 
Note: Pos = Position; G = Games played; AB = At bats; H = Hits; Avg. = Batting average; HR = Home runs; RBI = Runs batted in

Other batters 
Note: G = Games played; AB = At bats; H = Hits; Avg. = Batting average; HR = Home runs; RBI = Runs batted in

Pitching

Starting pitchers 
Note: G = Games pitched; IP = Innings pitched; W = Wins; L = Losses; ERA = Earned run average; SO = Strikeouts

Other pitchers 
Note: G = Games pitched; IP = Innings pitched; W = Wins; L = Losses; ERA = Earned run average; SO = Strikeouts

Relief pitchers 
Note: G = Games pitched; W = Wins; L = Losses; SV = Saves; ERA = Earned run average; SO = Strikeouts

Awards and honors 
National League Rookie of the Year
Rick Sutcliffe
TSN Rookie Pitcher of the Year Award
Rick Sutcliffe
NL Player of the Week
Dusty Baker (May 22–28)
Manny Mota (Aug. 27 – Sep. 3)

All-Stars 
1979 Major League Baseball All-Star Game
Steve Garvey, starter, first base
Davey Lopes, starter, second base
Ron Cey, reserve
TSN National League All-Star
Davey Lopes
Baseball Digest Rookie All-Star
Rick Sutcliffe

Farm system 

Teams in BOLD won League Championships

Major League Baseball Draft

The Dodgers drafted 36 players in the June draft and 11 in the January draft. Of those, five players would eventually play in the Major Leagues.

The Dodgers lost their first round pick in the June draft to the San Diego Padres because they signed free agent Derrel Thomas but they gained the first round picks of the Pittsburgh Pirates (compensation for Lee Lacy) and New York Yankees (for Tommy John).  With those picks they drafted two players from the University of Michigan, left-handed pitcher Steve Howe and right-handed pitcher Steve Perry. Howe was the 1980 NL Rookie of the Year, a 1981 World Series Champion and a 1982 All-Star. He played in 12 seasons and saved 328 games before a drug addiction forced him out of the game. Perry pitched six seasons in the minors, the last two with the AAA Albuquerque Dukes, and finished 28-40 with a 5.34 ERA before the Dodgers released him.

This year's draft class also included pitcher Orel Hershiser from Bowling Green University, who was picked in the 17th round.  He pitched 18 seasons (13 with the Dodgers), winning 204 games. He set a Major League record with a 59 consecutive scoreless inning streak in 1988 en route to winning the Cy Young Award and the World Series MVP. He was also a three-time All-Star.

Notes

References 
Baseball-Reference season page
Baseball Almanac season page

External links 
1979 Los Angeles Dodgers uniform
Los Angeles Dodgers official web site

Los Angeles Dodgers seasons
Los Angeles Dodgers
Los Angel